Mabel Florence Andrews (16 September 1912 – 18 June 1996) was a New Zealand fencer, who represented her country at the 1950 British Empire Games.

Early life and family
Born on 16 September 1912, Andrews was the daughter of Florence Mabel Andrews (née Cross) and Lancelot William Dolling Andrews.

Fencing
A member of the Christchurch Swords Club, Andrews won the New Zealand national women's fencing championship in 1939 and 1946, the competition not being held in the intervening years because of World War II. At the 1950 British Empire Games in Auckland, Andrews represented New Zealand in the individual women's foil, recording two wins to finish in sixth place.

Death
Andrews died on 18 June 1996.

Legacy
Fencing Mid South awards the Florence Andrews Trophy annually to the winner of the junior girls' foil.

References

1912 births
1996 deaths
Sportspeople from Christchurch
New Zealand female foil fencers
Commonwealth Games competitors for New Zealand
Fencers at the 1950 British Empire Games
20th-century New Zealand women